Elizabeth Eaton Rosenthal, also known as Elizabeth Sweetheart, was born in Nova Scotia in 1941. She is a fine artist, fabric designer and is well known as the "Green Lady of Brooklyn" for her love of the color green, with which she constantly wears and decorates her home.

Early life

Elizabeth Eaton was born in a small coal mining town in Nova Scotia, Canada.  She was raised by her grandparents in a log cabin near the Bay of Fundy.  Her grandmother taught Elizabeth to paint and to make clothing.
 
She attended Mount Allison University where she studied fine arts with the renowned Canadian painter Alex Colville.

Career

Not able to find appropriate work in Canada, Eaton hitchhiked to New York City in 1964. Arriving at the New York Unemployment Agency with only a pillow and her sketchbook, she was immediately sent for a job interview. She got a job working in an art department in the Garment Center.

In 1987 Eaton established her own design company, SweetPea Design Studio, which she ran for 15 years. She then ran a small art business in which she focused on expanding and selling fabrics from her well-stocked collection of vintage design fabrics.
 
Eaton is a fine artist. In addition to creating hand-painted prints for top clothing designers such as Michael Kors, Liz Claiborne, Calvin Klein, American Eagle Outfitters and Ralph Lauren, she makes tiny watercolor paintings.

Style

Known as the "Green Lady of Brooklyn," Eaton always wears green and decorates her home in various shades of green. She has donned green, from head to hair, in bright lime green since about 2000.  She is usually seen wearing overalls, and has about 30 pairs, all dyed green.

Personal life

Eaton married Robert Rosenthal, also an artist, in 1966 or 1967. They have one son, Sam Eaton, who is a mentalist.

References

1941 births
Living people
20th-century American women artists
Canadian women artists
Artists from Nova Scotia
Date of birth missing (living people)
Place of birth missing (living people)
Mount Allison University alumni
Artists from New York City
Canadian textile artists
Women textile artists
21st-century American women